Breakthrough is a 1950 American war film directed by Lewis Seiler and starring John Agar about an American infantry unit in World War II. Approximately one-third of the film was assembled from preexisting footage.

Plot
Captain Hale (David Brian) leads a company of infantrymen from the 1st Infantry Division from the D-Day landings through the Normandy campaign. They resent the presence of a fresh lieutenant Joe Mallory (John Agar).

Cast
 David Brian as Capt. Tom Hale  
 John Agar as Lt. Joe Mallory  
 Frank Lovejoy as platoon Sgt. Pete Bell  
 William Campbell as Cpl. Danny Dominick (as Bill Campbell)  
 Paul Picerni as Pvt. Edward P. Rojeck  
 Greg McClure as Pvt. Frank Finley  
 Richard Monahan as Pvt. 'Four-Eff' Nelson  
 Edward Norris as Sgt. Roy Henderson (as Eddie Norris)  
 Matt Willis as Pvt. Jumbo Hollis  
 Dick Wesson as Pvt. Sammy Hansen  
 Suzanne Dalbert as Collette  
 William Self as Pvt. George Glasheen  
 Danny Arnold as Pvt. Rothman  
 Danni Sue Nolan as Lt. Janis King  
 Howard Negley as Lt. Col. John Lewis
 Drue Mallory as Betsy

Notes
The picture makes use of official U.S. and British Army Air Force and Navy films, as well as captured German footage. Other scenes were filmed on location at Fort Ord near Monterey, California.

Reception
The film was very profitable, earning $2,095,000 domestically and $920,000 foreign.

References

External links
 

1950 films
Warner Bros. films
Operation Overlord films
American black-and-white films
Western Front of World War II films
Films set in 1944
World War II films based on actual events
Films scored by William Lava
American war drama films
1950s war drama films
American World War II films
1950s English-language films
Films directed by Lewis Seiler
1950s American films